AFI's Master Class: The Art of Collaboration is an American talk show broadcast on Turner Classic Movies.

Overview
Filmed in front of an audience of students at the AFI Conservatory the series explores artistic film collaborations.

Episodes
 Steven Spielberg & John Williams (November 7, 2011)
 Mark Wahlberg & David O. Russell (May 8, 2012)
 Robert Zemeckis & Don Burgess (January 14, 2013)
 Rob Reiner & Robert Leighton (December 10, 2014)

References

External links

2011 American television series debuts
American television talk shows
Filmmaking collaborations